This is a list of season 5 episodes of the Extreme Makeover: Home Edition series.

Episodes

See also
 List of Extreme Makeover: Home Edition episodes
 Extreme Makeover: Home Edition Specials

Notes

References 

2007 American television seasons
2008 American television seasons